Templepatrick is a village and civil parish in County Antrim, Northern Ireland. It is also close to Belfast International Airport and the village has several hotels. Templepatrick is the site of historic Church of Ireland, Presbyterian and the Old Presbyterian Church. It had a population of 1,437 people in the 2011 Census.

Places of interest
One side of the main street in Templepatrick consists of the demesne wall of Castle Upton. A mock fortified gateway in the wall at the centre of the village leads to the castle itself. The core of the main house is a tower house with walls up to five feet thick, built in 1611 by Sir Robert Norton, but later bought in 1625 by Captain Henry Upton. The family mausoleum is in the care of the National Trust and is open to visitors. The Templeton Hotel in the village was named after Lady Elizabeth Templetown, an aristocrat and writer who lived in Castle Upton in the 18th century.  In 2020 the Templeton became The Rabbit Hotel.
The Patterson's Spade Mill, which is now a small industrial museum, is nearby. It is a National Trust property.

History

The Troubles

1974
9 November 1974 - Patrick Courtney (29) and William Tierney (31), both Catholic civilians, were shot dead by the Protestant Action Force at their workplace, a garage, Clady Corner, near Templepatrick.

1976
25 June 1976 - Ruby Kidd (28), Francis Walker (17) and Joseph McBride (56), all Protestant civilians, were shot dead during a Republican Action Force gun attack on The Store Bar, Lyle Hill Road, Templepatrick.

People
Sir Robin Kinahan (d. 1997) and his son Danny Kinahan both politicians, of Castle Upton. Danny Kinahan is a cousin of Irish pop/rock star Chris De Burgh.
Lavinia Loughridge (1930–2014), physician, was born in Templepatrick.

Transport
Templepatrick railway station opened on 11 April 1848 and shut for passenger traffic on 21 February 1981.

Population

2011 Census
In the 2011 Census, Templepatrick had a population of 1,437 people (605 households).

2001 Census
Templepatrick is classified as a village by the NI Statistics and Research Agency (NISRA) (i.e. with a population between 1,000 and 2,250 people). On Census day (29 April 2001) there were 1,556 people living in Templepatrick. Of these:
19.4% were aged under 16 years and 20.6% were aged 60 and over
50.1% of the population were male and 49.9% were female
12.3% were from a Catholic background and 82.7% were from a Protestant background
1.2% of people aged 16–74 were unemployed.

See also
List of civil parishes of County Antrim
List of towns and villages in Northern Ireland

References

Villages in County Antrim
Civil parishes of County Antrim